The Pledge is a 2001 American neo-noir psychological mystery drama film directed by Sean Penn and starring Jack Nicholson alongside an ensemble supporting cast of Patricia Clarkson, Aaron Eckhart, Helen Mirren, Robin Wright Penn, Vanessa Redgrave, Sam Shepard, Mickey Rourke, Tom Noonan, Lois Smith and Benicio del Toro. It was in competition at the 2001 Cannes Film Festival.

The Pledge is based on Friedrich Dürrenmatt's 1958 novella The Pledge: Requiem for the Detective Novel. Dürrenmatt wrote the novella to refine the theme he originally developed in the screenplay for the 1958 German film It Happened in Broad Daylight with Heinz Rühmann.

Plot
Aging Reno, Nevada, police detective Jerry Black attends a retirement party hosted by his department, at which Captain Pollack presents Jerry tickets to a fishing trip in Mexico as a gift. The celebration is interrupted by the discovery of a murdered child, Ginny Larsen. Jerry decides to go with another detective, Stan Krolak, to the scene of the crime.

Jerry delivers the bad news to Ginny's parents, and the mother, Margaret Larsen, makes Jerry swear on a cross, made by their daughter, that he will find the killer. A suspect, Toby Jay Wadenah, a Native American man with an intellectual disability, is found the next day. Stan uses Toby's disorder to his advantage, convincing him that he killed Ginny. After having confessed to doing so, Toby steals a deputy's gun and commits suicide. An autopsy on Ginny proves that she had consumed chocolate before she died; wrappers found in Toby's truck solidify the likelihood that he killed the little girl, and the case is closed, despite Jerry’s suspicions.

Still adamant about his pledge to find the killer, Jerry chooses not to go to Mexico and misses his flight. Instead, he visits Ginny's grandmother, Annalise Hansen, who tells him of the many stories that she and Ginny used to read; one tells of an angel who descends from Heaven in order to fly a deceased child over all the places they loved in life, before delivering them to God. Jerry then visits one of Ginny's friends, Becky Fiske, who reveals that she had made friends with a man she called "The Giant" shortly before she was killed. Jerry finds a picture Ginny drew of "The Giant", but it does not resemble Toby, and features a black station wagon and not the red truck driven by Toby. He takes the drawing with him.

Jerry goes to Stan and asks him to reopen the case. Stan refuses but gets Jerry more information about similar cases in the area. Jerry's investigations reveal three local, unsolved cases that bear the same M.O. as seen with Ginny's, and which Toby could not have possibly committed because he was incarcerated at the time. Jerry presents his research and Ginny's drawing to Captain Pollack and Stan, who are doubtful.

While fishing, Jerry notices a gas station that is located near the center of the cases. After buying the station, Jerry moves into the house behind it and meets local waitress/bartender Lori, and her daughter, Chrissy. He takes an interest in Chrissy and becomes friends with the small family. One night, Lori shows up at Jerry's house, bruised and battered, and explains that her ex (who has a restraining order) attacked her. Jerry, out of concern for their safety, suggests that Lori and Chrissy move in with him temporarily; she agrees. Jerry slowly develops a fatherly relationship with Chrissy, and even begins a romance with Lori herself.

One day, local pastor Gary Jackson visits Chrissy outside the station. Jerry suspects that Jackson is Ginny's killer after he invites Chrissy to his church. Jerry rushes to the church after Jackson picks her up one day while he was fishing, but finds it was nothing more than a close call, and that Jackson is not the killer.

Meanwhile, Chrissy begins meeting with a man who drives a black car with a toy porcupine hanging on the rear mirror; porcupines were another aspect of Ginny's drawing that have set Jerry off. At night, while reading her a bed-time story, Chrissy tells Jerry that she met a "wizard" who gave her porcupine candies and told her not to tell her parents of their correspondence. Chrissy alerts Jerry to a meeting that will happen between her and the "wizard" the next day. Using Chrissy as bait, Jerry stages an operation with Stan's help to catch the killer. However, as they await his arrival, the "wizard" dies in a car accident; hours later, Stan gives up and tells Lori what happened. She confronts Jerry angrily about putting Chrissy in danger, and breaks up with him.

Sometime later, Jerry sits alone on a bench in front of the ruined gas station. Despondent, destitute, and drunk, Jerry ends up all alone, mumbling to himself that the killer is still out there, unaware that he is actually dead.

Cast

Production
The film was shot mainly on location in the British Columbia interior. While the opening scenes were filmed in Reno, Nevada, the rest of the film was shot in Keremeos, Princeton, Hedley, Merritt and Lytton, all in British Columbia. Tom Noonan recounts that, when Battlefield Earth flopped, the film's backers "were so freaked out... that they got on Sean [Penn] about finishing on time and finishing under budget, which wasn't really possible, because they were shooting in the mountains, and there were four or five scenes that I still had to shoot, which they never shot, which explain who I am in that film. Because I'm not the guy who killed the kids. I'm not the bad guy in the film." He has repeated this assertion: "There's another guy who's in a Mercedes that gets burned at the end. And people tell me I look like the guy in the Mercedes but that's not me. I'm the nice guy in that movie. At least in the script I am."

Home video
The film was released on DVD and VHS on June 19, 2001.

Reception

Box office
The Pledge did not perform well at the box office. The film opened in 1,275 theaters and grossed $5,765,347, with an average of $4,521 per theater and ranking #11 at the box office. The film ultimately earned $19,733,089 domestically and $9,686,202 internationally for a total of $29,419,291, below its $35 million production budget.

Critical response
The Pledge received mainly positive reviews from critics. The film has a "certified fresh" score of 78% on Rotten Tomatoes based on 124 reviews, with an average rating of 6.88/10. The critical consensus states: "Though its subject matter is grim and may make viewers queasy, The Pledge features an excellent, subtle performance by Jack Nicholson." The film also has a score of 71 out of 100 on Metacritic based on 33 critics indicating "Generally favorable reviews." Audiences polled by CinemaScore graded the film "D" on a scale of A+ to F.

James Berardinelli gave The Pledge three stars, calling it "clever in the way that it gradually reveals things, but never gives us too much information at one time." Roger Ebert gave the film three and a half stars out of four, and in 2012 upgraded it to four stars and added it to his "Great Movies" list, writing, "The last third of the movie is where most police stories go on autopilot, with obligatory chases, stalkings and confrontations. That's when The Pledge grows most compelling. Penn and Nicholson take risks with the material and elevate the movie to another, unanticipated, haunting level."

Accolades
 Sean Penn – Palme d'Or at the 2001 Cannes Film Festival – NOMINATED
 Grand Prix of the Belgian Syndicate of Cinema Critics – NOMINATED
 2002 for the Danish Bodil – NOMINATED
 Benicio Del Toro – 2002 ALMA Award – NOMINATED
 Brittany Tiplady – 2002 Young Artist Award – NOMINATED
 Hans Zimmer – 2001 World Soundtrack Award – NOMINATED

References

External links
 
 
 
 
 

2001 films
2001 drama films
2000s mystery drama films
2000s psychological drama films
American mystery drama films
American neo-noir films
American police detective films
American psychological drama films
Fiction about child murder
Films directed by Sean Penn
Films produced by Elie Samaha
Films scored by Klaus Badelt
Films scored by Hans Zimmer
Films based on Swiss novels
Films based on works by Friedrich Dürrenmatt
Films set in Reno, Nevada
Films shot in British Columbia
Films shot in Nevada
Franchise Pictures films
Morgan Creek Productions films
Warner Bros. films
2000s English-language films
2000s American films